The general securities principal exam, commonly referred to as the Series 24 exam, is administered by the U.S. Financial Industry Regulatory Authority (FINRA) which qualifies a registered individual to supervise or manage branch activities such as corporate securities, REITs, variable contracts, and venture capital; a general principal may also approve advertising and sales literature, including communications regarding municipal securities.  The exam covers topics such as supervision of investment banking, trading, customer accounts, and the primary/secondary markets.

A Series 24 license does not qualify an individual to function as a:

 Registered options principal – Series 4
 General securities sales supervisor for options and municipal securities – Series 9
 Municipal securities principal – Series 53
 Municipal fund securities principal – Series 51
 Financial and operations principal – Series 27
 Introducing broker/dealer financial and operations principal – Series 28

The Series 24 Exam is made up of 150 questions. Candidates have up to 3.5 hours to take the exam. 70% (105 correct answers) is considered a passing grade. In order to take the Series 24 exam, a candidate must be sponsored by a member firm of FINRA or another SRO (self-regulatory organization).

See also
 Financial Industry Regulatory Authority (FINRA)
 List of securities examinations
 Series 7
 Series 63

External links
SEC
Series 24 - General Securities Principal Exam at FINRA.org

United States securities law
Standardized tests in the United States
Professional certification in finance